Robert Spence may refer to:

Robert Spence (bishop) (1860–1934), Archbishop of Adelaide
Robert Spence (British politician) (1879–1966), MP for Berwick and Haddington
Robert Spence (Canadian politician) (1811–1868), political figure in Canada West
Robert Spence (engineer) (born 1933), British engineer and information visualization expert
Bob Spence (born 1946), former Major League Baseball player

See also
William Robert Spence (1875–1954), Scottish trade union leader

Spence (surname)